Marie-Angélique Servandoni (22 September 1749, Toulouse - 14 April 1822, Paris), stage name Angélique D'Hannetaire, was a French actress and opera singer.

She was the daughter of the actor and director D'Hannetaire and his wife, the actor Marguerite Hue.  Angélique made her debut at the Théâtre de la Monnaie aged 12 in La Servante maîtresse by Pierre Baurans, after the work by Pergolesi, beside Alexandre Bultos (like her, a student of Ignaz Vitzthumb, music-master of the Théâtre de la Monnaie). She was active at the Monnaie from 1766 until 1775. She often performed the role of heroine in romantic parts, and she also acted as a singer in opera buffa.

References
 Henri Liebrecht: Histoire du théatre français à Bruxelles au XVIIe et au XVIIIe siècle

1749 births
1822 deaths
18th-century French actresses
Actresses from Toulouse
French stage actresses